Muhammad Bey (died 1822) was a defterdar and husband of Nazli, the second eldest daughter of Muhammad Ali Pasha. Muhammad Bey was one of Muhammad Ali's trustworthy.

His career 
At first, he was appointed defterdar, and was distinguished by magnanimity, courage and intelligence.

At the beginning of the month of Safar al-Khair in the year 1232 AH / 1816 CE, the teacher attended Ghali from the tribal side, with correspondence from Muhammad Bey, who took over the Emirate of Upper Egypt instead of Ibrahim Pasha Ibn al-Basha, who went to the Hijaz countries to fight Wahhabism in which he mentions the advice of the teacher Ghali and his endeavor to open the doors of collecting money To the treasury, and that he invented something and accounts from which many amounts of money were obtained, and he was met with satisfaction and honor, and he took the pasha and assigned him and made him a clerk of his secret, and he was required to serve him, and he took what he was assigned to and attended for him, which includes the accounts of all the notebooks and pens of innovators and their directors and regional rulers. On the first Rabi` al-Awwal 1235 AH / 1819 CE, the Pasha Muhammad Bey dismissed the Defterdar from the Emirate of Upper Egypt and imitated Ahmed Pasha Ibn Taher Pasha in his place and traveled in his fifth. On the seventh, the pasha traveled to Alexandria to inspect the canal, and accompanied him, his son Ibrahim Pasha, Muhammad Bey, the defterdar, the old Kakhda, and Dabus Ugly.

Sudan Invasion 
Muhammad Ali Pasha entrusted his son-in-law, Muhammad Bey, the defterdar, the conquest of Kordofan, and that country belonged to the Sultan of Darfur, so while Ismael Pasha was crawling on Sennar, the Army of Defterdar marched to its destination on the road to Dongola and Abu Qas, and the journey to Kordofan was deadly arduous for the soldiers because they walked seven consecutive days cutting the Fiaví In a desert that has no water and no planting.

The defterdar met the army of the deputy of Sultan Muhammad al-Fadl, the Sultan of Darfur, and the two teams clashed in a bloody incident in the town of Bara, north of Al-Obeid (April 1821), which ended with the victory of the Defertdar army and the occupation of Al-Abyad, the capital of Kordofan.

The Battle of Bara was the most intense battle the Turkish army fought in the first conquest, in which the Kordofan army showed great courage, but the Turkish army's defenders and soldiers from the Egyptians overcame them and the Sultan of Darfur tried after the battle to take Kordofan back and raided it, but he returned disappointed.

Revenge for the death of Ismail 
Ismail stayed for a while in Sennar managing the matter of the government he founded, then he sent groups of Sudanese prisoners, accompanied by groups of soldiers to Aswan, to be recruited into the regular Ottoman Turkish army that Muhammad Ali was serious in establishing, and he also prepared to return to Egypt, an elevator in the Nile.

In the meantime, it was learned that the people of Halfaya and Shendi and their surroundings revolted against the Turkish authority, and the misfortunes of the soldiers, especially the Arna'it, were among the reasons for the people's rampage and revolt. Shown.

As for Ishmael Pasha, he pardoned him in return for a heavy financial fine that he would pay in five days and a thousand of slaves, and the king showed the tiger of acquiescence and before he could bear the fine, then he invited Ismail Pasha and his entourage to a feast in his palace with Shendi, and it was from the outrage. The king welcomed them with a great welcome, and ordered his assistants to gather what they could of wood, straw and hay around the palace under the pretext of fodder for the pasha's horses. It flew in the piles of wood and straw surrounding the palace, and if it had aunt her and flared up around her, she made the palace a torch from hell, and the fire confined Ismail Pasha and his entourage, so they could not escape from this infernal siege of the horrors of the working fire, and the king's soldiers surrounded them, throwing them with nobles and arrows from every side. The tracks were blocked in their faces until they died from the last of them, and the soldiers could not help them as they were in their camp two far from the place of the tragedy, and when the disaster occurred, the king's men engraved a tiger on them and they killed them, and only those who escaped with life escaped.

References 

1822 deaths
Year of birth missing